Liam Evans may refer to:

Liam Evans (footballer) (born 1997), Bermudian footballer
Liam Evans (Holby City), a fictional character on British medical drama television series Holby City
 Liam Evans, a pseudonym used by Andrew Doyle (comedian)